The flag of Khakassia is used by the Republic of Khakassia, a federal subject of Russia.  It consists of a blue-white-red horizontal tricolour with a green vertical band on the hoist containing a traditional yellow sun device.  The ratio of the flag is 1:2 and it was adopted 25 September 2003.

History
During Soviet rule, Khakassia existed as the Khakas Autonomous Oblast and did not have its own flag. In February 1992, after the fall of the Soviet Union, Khakassia became one of the republics of Russia, and on 6 June 1992, Khakassia adopted its first flag. The earliest version of the flag of Khakassia was similar to the current one, but the sun on the hoist was black and the colours of the tricolour were white-blue-red, similar to the flag of Russia. On 23 December 1993, the colour of the sun was changed from black to yellow.

The usage of the Russian flag on regional flags is forbidden in Russia, but Khakassia was granted exception to the rule as its flag was designed before the law was passed. Despite being exempt from the rule, on 25 September 2003 the order of the stripes on the flag of Khakassia was changed from white-blue-red to blue-white-red, so that the order of the stripes no longer mimicked the Russian flag.

Historical flags

References

External links
 

Flag of Khakassia
Flags of the federal subjects of Russia
Khakassia
Khakassia